The 2013 African U-20 Championship qualification phase consisted of three rounds of two-legged matches. Some countries had a bye to the First Round. The winners of the Second Round matches qualifies for the finals.

Preliminary round
The first legs were played on 20, 21 and 22 April, and the second legs on 4, 5 and 6 May 2012.

|}

First round
The first legs were played on 27, 28 and 29 July, and the second legs on 10, 11 and 12 August 2012.

|}

1 The Benin v Côte d'Ivoire (1st leg) was postponed to 5 August 2012.
2 Gambia withdrew following the first leg.
3 Zimbabwe withdrew following the first leg.
4 Lesotho withdrew.

Second round
The first legs have been played on 21, 22, 23 September 2012, and the second legs on 5, 6, 7 October 2012.

|}

Qualified teams

References

External links
Matches and Results

Qualication
Qualification
2013